The Permanent Delegate of Australia to the United Nations Educational, Scientific and Cultural Organization is an officer of the Australian Department of Foreign Affairs and Trade and the head of the delegation of the Commonwealth of Australia to the United Nations Educational, Scientific and Cultural Organization (UNESCO) in Paris, France. The position has the rank and status of an Ambassador Extraordinary and Plenipotentiary and is but one of Australia's representatives to the United Nations and its other bodies, shared with the representatives present at the United Nations Office in Geneva, the United Nations Office in Vienna, the United Nations Office at Nairobi, and the delegation to the United Nations Agencies in Rome.

The Permanent Delegate, since January 2020, isMegan Anderson.

Posting history
Australia has been a member of UNESCO since its establishment on 4 November 1946, with the permanent delegation based in the Australian Embassy in Paris. In 1977, Prime Minister Malcolm Fraser offered the position of Permanent Delegate to UNESCO to Sir John Kerr, who as Governor-General had been responsible for the dismissal of Gough Whitlam's government in the 1975 Australian constitutional crisis, but considerable public pressure prompted Fraser to withdraw the offer to Kerr, and offer the post to Professor Ralph Slatyer instead. At various periods of the office's history the Australian Permanent Delegate has been held by the Australian Ambassador to France. Since 1990 the Permanent Delegate has been typically held by the Deputy Head of Mission in Paris, who also serves since 2010 as Australia's non-resident Ambassador to the Republic of Chad.

List of Permanent Delegates

Notes
 Also Ambassador to France.
 Also non-resident Ambassador to Chad, 2010–present.

See also
Australia and the United Nations

References

External links

Australian Permanent Delegation to UNESCO

 
UNESCO